St Cadoc's Church, Raglan, Monmouthshire, south east Wales, is the parish church of the village of Raglan. The church is situated at a cross-roads in the centre of the village.  Built originally by the Clare and Bluet families in the thirteenth and fourteenth centuries, it was rebuilt, and expanded by the Herbert's of Raglan Castle in the fifteenth century.  In the nineteenth century, the church was subject to a major restoration by Thomas Henry Wyatt.

Built in the Decorated style, the church is a Grade II* listed building.

History
Sir Joseph Bradney, the Monmouthshire antiquarian, described the church in his multi-volume A History of Monmouthshire from the Coming of the Normans into Wales down to the Present Time. He recorded the earliest church on the site as having been founded by Saint David, the patron saint of Wales. He further noted that "for some reason which is not apparent the modern ecclesiastical authorities consider Cattwg (Cadoc) to be the patron saint". Hando also noted the controversy as to the dedication, and mentioned a will dated 1494 which references "Sancta Cadoci ville de Raglan." The present church was probably begun by the de Clare family, earliest Lords of Raglan, and completed in the fourteenth century by the Bluets.  The church was greatly expanded by the Herberts of Raglan Castle, and by their successors, the Somersets, Earls and Marquesses of Worcester and Dukes of Beaufort. The Beaufort (North) Chapel, constructed by the Somersets, contains three monumental tombs of the Earls of Worcester, hereditary Lords of Raglan and of Raglan Castle in the Middle Ages, with their remains interred within the crypt below the Beaufort Chapel, the side chapel to the north of the nave. These monuments were mutilated by Parliamentarian troops during the English Civil War, they represent William Somerset, 3rd Earl of Worcester, Edward Somerset, 4th Earl of Worcester and his wife, Lady Elizabeth Hastings.

Charles Somerset, Marquess of Worcester, who died in a coaching accident between Raglan and Monmouth, is also buried in the church. Bradney records a tablet placed in the chapel by Henry Somerset, 8th Duke of Beaufort in 1868, which details all of the Somerset interments.

The church tower clock is notable for having only three faces; the Monmouthshire writer Fred Hando records that the benefactor, Miss Anna Maria Bosanquet, declined to provide a fourth face, pointing in the direction of Raglan Station, having fallen out with the station's owners.

There are also a number of memorials to the Barons Raglan, of nearby Cefntilla Court, including a stained glass window "commemorating the military exploits of FitzRoy Somerset, 1st Baron Raglan" in the Crimean War.

Architecture and description
The chancel and the nave date from the fourteenth century, whilst the "fine, tall" west tower is fifteenth century. The architectural historian John Newman considers the tower's diagonal buttresses "unusual" and suggests their styling dates them to similar work being carried out at Raglan Castle in the 1460s. The Beaufort (North) Chapel, the resting place of many of the lords of Raglan, dates from the middle sixteenth century. The font is original and was returned to the church in the 1920s, after being discovered buried in his garden by the then vicar.

The rest dates predominantly from the mid-Victorian restoration carried out by Thomas Henry Wyatt in 1867–8. All of the church's stained glass dates from this time. The restoration was carried out for Henry Somerset, 8th Duke of Beaufort and included the construction of the Lady Chapel. Re-roofing of Wyatt's nineteenth century roof in 2016 revealed the late-medieval "wagon-roof", a type of roofing common in medieval Monmouthshire.

The churchyard contains the "unusually fine" base and stump of a medieval cross.

Vicars since 1560

1560, John Gallin (Gwillim) 
1635, William Rogers 
1640, William Davies 
1661, John Davies
1678, Rice Morris 
1682, William Hopkins 
1709, Richard Tyler, B.A. 
1715, David Price 
1746, John Leach. B.A. 
1781, Thomas Leach. (died 1796 at Blakeney, Glos.)
1796, Charles Phillips, B.A. 
1818, William Powell, M.A. 
1866, Arthur Montague Wyatt 
1874, Henry Plantagenet Somerset, M.A. 
1893, Charles Mathew Perkins, M.A. 
1903, Robert Shelley Plant.
1924, David James Sproule, B.A. 
1928, Thomas Wright, B.A. 
1939, Charles Duck, L. Div. 
1952, William Joseph Price 
1958, Arthur Vernon Blake, B.A. 
1975, Peter Charles Gwynne Gower 
1991, Simon Llewellyn Guest 
2005, Joan Wakeling 
2014, The Rev'd Canon Tim Clement

Burials in the Somerset Crypt
Underneath the church is the Somerset family crypt. A tablet was erected in the church in 1868 by the 8th Duke of Beaufort stating:In the vaults beneath are interred:

 William Somerset, 3rd Earl of Worcester, K.G. died 21st February, 1589.
 Edward Somerset, 4th Earl of Worcester, K.G. died 3rd March 1627.
 Elizabeth, his wife, daughter of Francis Hardinge, Earl of Huntingdon 1621.
 Edward, 6th Earl and 2nd Marquis of Worcester, died 3rd April 1667.
 Mary, daughter of Edward, 6th Earl, and his wife, died in infancy.
 Charles, 2nd son of Henry, 7th Earl, 3rd Marquis, and 1st Duke of Beaufort, died 13 July 1698.
 Edward, 3rd son of the above, died in infancy.
 Henry, 4th son of the above, died 1st April, 1667.
 Elizabeth, elder daughter of the above.
 Rebecca, wife of Charles, Marquis of Worcester, eldest son of Henry, 1st Duke of Beaufort, [died] July 27th [1712] aged 44.
 Mary, daughter of Charles, 2nd Duke of Beaufort , died in her infancy, 1685.
 John, 3rd son of Charles, 2nd Duke of Beaufort, died 31st December, 1704.
Other than interments, the vault is known to have been disturbed on at least 4 occasions:

 During the English Civil War, (1642 - 1651) Roundheads opened the vault and destroyed some tombs. The remains of 3 effigies destroyed in this action were moved to the Beaufort Chapel.
 At some point prior the 1797 publication of "Historical and Descriptive Account of the Present State of Ragland Castle", Charles Heath, a printer and writer from Monmouth, twice visited the church and found the chancel floor collapsed giving access to the two rooms which make up the vault. He surveyed the vault and documented his findings in the same work. He discovered seven lead coffin linings: five in the main room and two in a recess. Additionally, he discovered the remains of the wooden caskets and the ornamental metalwork, strewn across the floor, either from the previous desecration of the roundheads, or from natural decomposition of the wooden coffins.

 On 11 December 1860, Mr Osmond A Wyatt, the land agent for the Monmouth estates, opened the vault with "four strong burning lamps", again encountering seven lead coffin linings as before, but noting that one of the lead coffin linings appears to have been opened, and that the detritus on the floor included bones, either from the Roundheads desecration, or from the decomposition of coffins which were not lead lined. This survey was a precursor to the excavation of 1861.

 On 4 January 1861, Bennet Woodcroft, of the London Patent Office, his companion John Macgregor, a philanthropist, traveller and writer, Wyatt, the land agent, a carpenter, three labourers, the sexton and clerk opened the crypt in search of a model steam engine which Edward, the second Marquis, specified should be buried with him. They opened two of the seven coffin linings but did not find the model.

The details of the seven extant coffins observed at the documented openings of the crypt are in the table below:

Footnotes

Notes

References

External links
  St Cadoc's Church, Raglan, Wales

Grade II* listed churches in Monmouthshire
History of Monmouthshire
Church in Wales church buildings
14th-century church buildings in Wales
Thomas Henry Wyatt buildings